Gallium(III) oxide is an inorganic compound and ultra-wide bandgap semiconductor with the formula Ga2O3. It is actively studied for applications in power electronics, phosphors, and gas sensing. The compound has several polymorphs, of which the monoclinic β-phase is the most stable. The β-phase’s bandgap of 4.7–4.9 eV and large-area, native substrates make it a promising competitor to GaN and SiC-based power electronics applications and solar-blind UV photodetectors.  Ga2O3 exhibits reduced thermal conductivity and electron mobility by an order of magnitude compared to GaN and SiC, but is predicted to be significantly more cost-effective due to being the only wide-bandgap material capable of being grown from melt. β-Ga2O3 is thought to be radiation hard which makes it promising for military and space applications.

Preparation
Gallium trioxide is precipitated in hydrated form upon neutralization of acidic or basic solution of gallium salt. Also, it is formed on heating gallium in air or by thermally decomposing gallium nitrate at 200–250 ˚C. 

Crystalline Ga2O3 can occur in five polymorphs, α, β, γ, δ, and ε. Of these polymorphs β-Ga2O3 is the most thermodynamically stable phase at standard temperature and pressure while α-Ga2O3 is the most stable polymorph under high pressures.

 β-Ga2O3 Epitaxial thin films can be deposited heteroepitaxially on substrates such as sapphire, GaN, SiC, and Si, as well as homoepitaxially. For example, ALD on sapphire substrates at temperatures between 190 °C and 550 °C have been demonstrated. High quality β-Ga2O3 films have also been grown using techniques such as MBE, HVPE, and MOVPE. HVPE is preferred for vertical power semiconductor devices due to its fast growth rate. β-Ga2O3 epitaxial films grown by MOVPE exhibit higher electron mobilities and lower background carrier concentrations than those grown by other thin film growth techniques. 

Bulk substrates of β-Ga2O3 can be produced, which is one of the major advantages of this material system. Bulk substrates can be produced in multiple orientations and by multiple techniques.
 α-Ga2O3 can be obtained by heating β-Ga2O3 at 65 kbars and 1100 °C. It has a corundum structure. The hydrated form can be prepared by decomposing precipitated and "aged" gallium hydroxide at 500 °C. Epitaxial thin films of α-Ga2O3 deposited on c-plane (0001), m-plane (10-10), or a-plane (11-20) sapphire substrates have been demonstrated.
 γ-Ga2O3 is prepared by rapidly heating the hydroxide gel at 400–500 °C. A more crystalline form of this polymorph can be prepared directly from gallium metal by a solvothermal synthesis.
 δ-Ga2O3 is obtained by heating Ga(NO3)3 at 250 °C.
 ε-Ga2O3 is prepared by heating δ-Ga2O3 at 550 °C. Thin films of ε-Ga2O3 are deposited by means of metalorganic vapour-phase epitaxy using trimethylgallium and water on sapphire substrates at temperatures between 550 and 650 °C

Reactions
Gallium(III) trioxide is amphoteric. It reacts with alkali metal oxides at high temperature to form, e.g., NaGaO2, and with Mg, Zn, Co, Ni, Cu oxides to form spinels, e.g., MgGa2O4.
It dissolves in strong alkali to form a solution of the gallate ion, .

With HCl, it forms gallium trichloride GaCl3.
 Ga2O3 + 6 HCl → 2 GaCl3 + 3 H2O

It can be reduced to gallium suboxide (gallium(I) oxide) Ga2O by H2. or by reaction with gallium metal:
 Ga2O3 + 2 H2 → Ga2O + 2 H2O

 Ga2O3 + 4 Ga → 3 Ga2O

Structure
β-Ga2O3, with a melting point of 1900 ˚C, is the most stable crystalline modification. The oxide ions are in a distorted cubic closest packing arrangement, and the gallium (III) ions occupy distorted tetrahedral and octahedral sites, with Ga–O bond distances of 1.83 and 2.00 Å respectively.

α-Ga2O3 has the same structure (corundum) as α-Al2O3, wherein Ga ions are 6-coordinate.

γ-Ga2O3 has a defect spinel structure similar to that of γ-Al2O3.

ε-Ga2O3 films deposited by metalorganic vapour phase epitaxy show a columnar structure with orthorhombic crystal symmetry. Macroscopically, this structure is seen by X-ray crystallography as hexagonal close packed.

κ-Ga2O3 has an orthorhombic structure and forms with 120° twin domains resulting in hexagonal symmetry which is often identified as ε-Ga2O3.

Applications
Gallium(III) oxide has been studied for usage as passive components in lasers, phosphors, and luminescent materials as well as active components for gas sensors, power diodes, and power transistors. Since the first publication in January 2012 by the National Institute of Information and Communications Technology, in collaboration with Tamura Co., Ltd. and Koha Co., Ltd. of the world's first single-crystal gallium oxide (Ga2O3) field-effect transistors, the predominant interest in gallium oxide is in the β-polymorph for power electronics.

Monoclinic β-Ga2O3 has shown increasing performance since 2012 approaching state of the art GaN and SiC power devices. β-Ga2O3 Schottky diodes have exceeded breakdown voltages of 2400 V. β-Ga2O3/NiOx p–n diodes have exhibited breakdown voltages over 1200 V. β-Ga2O3 MOSFETs have individually achieved figures of merits of  fT of 27 GHz, fMAX of 48 GHz, and 5.4 MV/cm average breakdown field. This field exceeds that which is possible in SiC or GaN.

ε-Ga2O3 thin films deposited on sapphire show potential applications as solar-blind UV photodetector.

References

Gallium compounds
Sesquioxides